Terence John Hubbard (born 6 November 1950) is a Welsh former professional footballer who played as a midfielder in the Football League for Swindon Town. He was on the books of Swansea City, without representing them in the League, and also played for Yeovil Town. Hubbard played for his country at schoolboy and under-23 levels.

References

1950 births
Living people
Footballers from Pontypool
Welsh footballers
Wales under-23 international footballers
Association football midfielders
Swindon Town F.C. players
Swansea City A.F.C. players
Yeovil Town F.C. players
English Football League players